Citizens' Plaza (or Citizen's Plaza) is an urban plaza in Shinjuku, Tokyo, Japan.

Public art
Artworks installed in the plaza include:
 Adam Y Eva (Junkanmutan) (Munehiro Ikeda)
 Blacken Sproute (Churyo Sato)
 Column of Four Squares Eccentric (George Rickey)
 Epidauros・Reminiscence (Toshio Yodoi)
 Flutter (Yasutake Dvunakoshi)
 In the wind (Goro Kakei)
 Listening to the Heaven (Keiko Amemiya)
 Mari (Kyoko Asakura)
 my sky hole 91 Tokyo (Bukichi Inoue)
 Song of a dog (Yoshitatsu Yanaguihara)
 Three Rectangles Horizontal Jointed Gyratory (George Rickey)

References

External links

 

Geography of Tokyo
Shinjuku